Lisle Ernest Nagel (born 6 March 1905, Bendigo, Victoria — died 23 November 1971, Mornington, Victoria) was an Australian cricketer who played in one Test in 1932.

A tall right-arm fast bowler, Nagel played one match for Victoria in 1927–28, then played regularly between 1930–31 and 1933–34. He took 19 wickets at 25.05 in the 1931–32 season, including 6 for 35 against South Australia.

He was selected for an Australian XI that played the MCC in Melbourne in November 1932, and took 8 for 32 in the second innings to dismiss the MCC for 60. He played in the First Test that followed shortly afterwards, and took two wickets, but was left out of the Second Test.

He toured India and Ceylon with Frank Tarrant's Australian team in 1935–36.

Lisle played 139 First XI Victorian district cricket matches for Melbourne between 1927 and 1947, taking 438 wickets at 14.74. He took 86 wickets in the 1939-40 season, which as of 2021 stands as the most by a bowler in a district cricket season.

His twin brother, Vernon, also played first-class cricket for Victoria.

See also
 One Test Wonder
 List of Victoria first-class cricketers

References

External links
 Lisle Nagel at Cricket Archive
 Lisle Nagel at Cricinfo

1905 births
1971 deaths
Australia Test cricketers
Victoria cricketers
Sportspeople from Bendigo
Melbourne Cricket Club cricketers
Australian cricketers
Australian twins
Twin sportspeople
Cricketers from Victoria (Australia)